Hamid Mirzadeh (born November 29, 1950) is an Iranian politician and academic who was the 3rd president of the Islamic Azad University system.

Early life and education
He was born on 29 November 1950 in Sirjan, Kerman Province. He was educated in Sirjan and received his diploma in Mathematics.

Political career
Mirtzadeh had served political positions in three governments (Mohammad-Java Bahonar, Mir-Hossein Mousavi and Akbar Hashemi Rafsanjani). He was Mayor of Sirjan from 1980 to 1981. He became Governor of Kerman in 1981. In October 1985, he was appointed as Deputy Prime Minister by Mir-Hossein Mousavi. He resigned from the position on 3 August 1989. Four years later, he was appointed as Head of Management and Planning Organization by President Akbar Hashemi Rafsanjani. Program "Iran 1400", the "oil economy" and the "poverty" are part of his measures as Head of the Organization.

Academic career
He became a member of faculty of the Shahid Bahonar University of Kerman. Then, he became member of faculties of the Amir Kabir University and Tehran University. He is a faculty member of the Islamic Azad University Central Tehran Branch. He is also a professor at Amir Kabir University for more than thirty years. Mirzadeh was the head of Iran Polymer and Petrochemical Institute and editor in chief of Iranian Polymer Journal for years. He wrote several books and dozens of scientific reports and patents and 72 research projects and nearly 72 graduate students at Masters and PhD courses in polymer engineering, respectively. Currently based on a scientific base, Scopus 2017h. He has 32scientific index. He also awarded as Master of the Year in 2008. His nomination was approved by Supreme Council of Cultural Revolution and he was appointed as the university's vice president. After Farhad Daneshjoo was removed from his position on 18 September 2013, Mirzadeh becomes acting president of the university.

See also 
Higher education in Iran
Islamic Azad University

References

External links 

|-

|-

|-

|-

|-

1950 births
Living people
Academic staff of Shahid Bahonar University of Kerman
Academic staff of the Islamic Azad University
University of New South Wales alumni
Vice Presidents of Iran for Executive Affairs
People from Sirjan